Lernahovit may refer to:
Lernahovit, Lori, Armenia
Lernahovit, Gegharkunik, Armenia
Lernahovit, Kashatagh Region, Nagarno-Karabakh